Garden City Township is a township in Finney County, Kansas, United States.  As of the 2000 census, its population was 7,400. The population had decreased to 5,761 at the 2010 census.

Geography
According to the USGS, it contains three cemeteries: Hulpieu Homestead, Sunset Memorial Gardens and Valley View.

Demographics

Transportation
Garden City Township contains one airport or landing strip, Garden City Experiment Station Airport.

References

Further reading

External links
 City-Data.com
 Finney County maps: Current, Historic, KDOT

Townships in Finney County, Kansas
Townships in Kansas